Rectiostoma ochrobasis is a moth in the family Depressariidae. It was described by W. Donald Duckworth in 1971. It is found in the humid low highlands of south-eastern Peru and Bolivia.

The wingspan is 8–9 mm. The forewings are dark brown, with a pale yellow transverse band from the costa to the dorsum at the basal fourth, parallel to the distal margin of the yellow band extends a dark brown line followed by a broader band of iridescent blue. The apical two thirds of the forewing has a wide area of dark brown, scattered with iridescent bronze scales, followed distally by irregular patterns of iridescent violet. The hindwings are dark brown with a white patch on the anterior margin.

References

Moths described in 1971
Rectiostoma